Milne may refer to:

People with the surname Milne
Milne (surname)

Places
Milne Bay, large bay in Milne Bay Province
Milne Bay Province, Papua New Guinea
Milne Inlet, Nunavut, Canada
Milne Land, large island in eastern Greenland
Milne Townsite, an abandoned subdivision of Temagami, Ontario
Milne (crater), a large lunar crater in the southern hemisphere on the far side of the Moon

Other uses
Battle of Milne Bay, battle of the Pacific campaign of World War II
HMS Milne, the name of two ships of the Royal Navy
Milne model, a special-relativistic cosmological model proposed by Edward Arthur Milne

See also
Miln
Milnes
Mylne